Viktorija is a feminine given name. Individuals bearing the name Viktorija include:
Viktorija (Snežana Mišković; born 1958), Serbian rock singer
Viktorija Andrulytė (born 1992), Lithuanian yacht racer
Viktorija Budrytė-Winnersjo (born 1989), Lithuanian footballer
Viktorija Čmilytė (born 1983), Lithuanian chess grandmaster and politician
Viktorija Daniliauskaitė (born 1951), Lithuanian printmaker and book illustrator
Viktorija Daujotytė (born 1944), Lithuanian literary critic and philologist
Viktorija Faith (born 1986), Lithuanian singer and actress
Viktorija Golubic (born 1992), Swiss tennis player
Viktorija Karatajūtė-Šarauskienė (1948–2007), Lithuanian ceramic artist
Viktorija Loba (born 1988), Russian-born Macedonian pop singer
Viktorija Ni (born 1991), Latvian-American chess player
Viktorija Novosel (born 1989), Croatian pop singer
Viktorija Rajicic (born 1994), Australian tennis player
Viktorija Žemaitytė (born 1985), Lithuanian heptathlete

References 

Feminine given names
Croatian feminine given names
Latvian feminine given names
Lithuanian feminine given names
Macedonian feminine given names
Serbian feminine given names
Slovene feminine given names